Kocyan is a surname. Notable people with the surname include:

Antoni Kocyan (1836–1916), Polish ornithologist
Wojciech Kocyan, Polish pianist

See also
Kocian
Kocjan (disambiguation)
Kóczián

Polish-language surnames